"Next to You" is a song written by Sting and recorded by The Police as the opening track on their debut album Outlandos d'Amour in 1978.

The song was performed regularly on the early Police tours, and Sting later included it during his 'Broken Music' tour in 2005–2006. It was the song performed for the second encore during The Police's 2007 Reunion tour. In the Paris show (on 29 September), former band member Henry Padovani joined the band on stage to play this song. "Next to You" is the last song The Police played live together.

When Sting originally presented the song to his bandmates, they felt it was neither aggressive nor political enough for the early punk sensibility of The Police. Andy Summers and Stewart Copeland suggested replacing the lyrics, with Summers offering "I'm going to take a gun to you". Sting vetoed this and kept his original love song lyrics instead. The song also includes a slide guitar solo which Copeland dismissed as "old wave," yet Summers shared that as of 2000, he was still getting letters "about that brilliant slide guitar solo".

References

1978 songs
The Police songs
Songs written by Sting (musician)